Jim Pleydell (born 1 April 1944) is a former Australian rules footballer who played with Carlton in the Victorian Football League (VFL).

He later played in Tasmania with Cooee in the NWFU competition, winning the club's Best and Fairest award in 1971.

Notes

External links 

Jim Pleydell's profile at Blueseum

1944 births
Carlton Football Club players
Maffra Football Club players
Cooee Football Club players
Australian rules footballers from Victoria (Australia)
Living people